Kamel Touati (born 22 February 1958) is a Tunisian actor. He is best known for his role as Slimen Labyedh on the Tunisian Television series Choufli Hal.

Filmography

Cinema 
 1974 : Sejnane by Abdellatif Ben Ammar
 1986 : La Coupe by Mohamed Damak : Rached
 1990 : Halfaouine Child of the Terraces by Férid Boughedir
 1992 :
 Poussière de diamant by Mahmoud Ben Mahmoud and Fadhel Jaïbi
 Le Sultan de la médina by Moncef Dhouib : Sargene
 1994 : The Silences of the Palace by Moufida Tlatli : Hussein
 1995 :
 Madame Butterfly by Frédéric Mitterrand : oncle Yakusidé
 Le Magique by Azedine Melliti : Deanie's father
 1997 : Bent Familia by Nouri Bouzid : Slah
 1998 :
 Ou noir ou blanc by Anouar Ben Aïssa
 Festin by Mohamed Damak (short film) : Kamel Touati
 2014 : Une Journée sans femme, short film by Najwa Slama Limam
 2019 : Avant qu'il ne soit tard by Majdi Lakhdhar : Hassen

Television 
 1992 : Un inviato molto speciale by Vittorio De Sisti : the perfumer
 1995 :
 Bab El Khoukha d'Abdeljabbar Bhouri : Mohsen
 Edhak Ledonia by Tahar Fazaa : Rzouga
 2001 : Hercule Poirot by Brian Eastman : Squat Man
 2003 : Chez Azaïez by Hatem Bel Hadj : Azaïez
 2004 : Loutil (L'Hôtel) by Slaheddine Essid : Cherif Tounsi
 2005–2009 : Choufli Hal by Hatem Bel Hadj : Slimane Labiedh
 2010 : Dar Lekhlaa by Ahmed Rajab : Kraiem
 2012 : Dar Louzir by Slaheddine Essid : Ismaïl Bourigua
 2014 : Talaa Wala Habet by Majdi Smiri : Ammar
 2015 : Ambulance by Lassaad Oueslati : Majid
 2015–2017 : Bolice by Majdi Smiri : Rchid
 2015–2018 : Nsibti Laaziza by Slaheddine Essid : Azzouz
 2016 : Embouteillage by Walid Tayaa : Morched
 2018 : Elli Lik Lik by Kaïs Chekir : Farhat Gharbi
 2019 : Zanket El Bacha by Nejib Mnasria : Mahmoud Bacha
 2020 : Nouba (season 2) by Abdelhamid Bouchnak: Omrane Bradaris
 2021 : El Foundou by Saoussen Jemni : Marouki

Videos 
 2009 : advertising spot for GlobalNet
 2011 : advertising spot for the Tunisian margarine brand Régina

Theater 
 1974 : Le Chariot by Lamine Nahdi and Jamel Eddine Ben Rahal
 1975 : Meriah
 1989 :
 El Aweda, text and director by Fadhel Jaïbi and Fadhel Jaziri
 Klem Ellil by Taoufik Jebali
 1992 : Comedia, text and director by Fadhel Jaïbi
 1993 : Familia, text and director by Fadhel Jaïbi
 1999 : Contre X by Taoufik Jebali
 2004 : Ahna hakka
 2015 : Ré... animation
 2020 : Mammou W Chhima by Lassaâd Ben Abdallah

Emissions 
 2013 :
 5outh Bayek on Radio IFM : guest
 Labès with Naoufel Ouertani on El Hiwar El Tounsi : season 3 episode 2 guest
 2014 : Braquage on Jawhara FM : guest
 2016 :
 Romdhane Show with Hedi Zaiem on Mosaïque FM : guest
 2018 : Le Programme with Amine Gara on Attessia TV : guest
 2020 :
 Noujoum with Naoufel Ouertani : guest
 Tak Ö Tak on Mosaïque FM : guest
 Tounes El Yaoum with Mariem Belkadhi : season 2 episode 100 guest
 2021 :
 Fekret Sami Fehri with Hedi Zaiem on El Hiwar El Tounsi : season 3 episode 26 guest

References

External links 

Tunisian male film actors
People from Tunis
1952 births
Living people
21st-century Tunisian male actors